Jim McQuillan may refer to:

Jim McQuillan (chemist), Fellow of the Royal Society Te Apārangi
Jim McQuillan (computer programmer), founder and project leader of the Linux Terminal Server Project
Jim McQuillan (darts player) (born 1940), Irish former darts player